is a Japanese professional shogi player, ranked 7-dan.

Early life
Yoshiyuki Kubota was born in Adachi, Tokyo on May 18, 1972. In 1984, he won the 9th , and later that same year entered the Japan Shogi Association's apprentice school at the rank of 6-kyū under the guidance of shogi professional . He was promoted to 1-dan in 1988, and  full professional status and the rank of 4-dan in April 1994.

Promotion history
The promotion history for Kubota is as follows:
 6-kyū: 1984
 1-dan: 1988
 4-dan: April 1, 1994
 5-dan: August 1, 1998
 6-dan: January 22, 2007
 7-dan: June 1, 2016

References

External links 

ShogiHub: Professional Player Info · Kubota, Yoshiyuki
義七郎武藏國日記 (本人更新のブログ) · Kubota's blog 

1972 births
Japanese shogi players
Living people
Professional shogi players
Professional shogi players from Tokyo
People from Adachi, Tokyo